Jawga Boyz is an American country rap group formed in Athens, Georgia in 2003. The current lineup is  D Thrash, BoonDock, Cornbread, Dez, Chris Hood, Sloppy Jones, and Dreadneck. They have released four studio albums including 2014's Tailgate Music, which debuted at number 155 on the Billboard 200, number 22 on the Country Albums chart and number 17 on the Rap Albums chart. Steve Leggett of AllMusic gave Tailgate Music a favorable review, writing that it "keeps the fun and quality up, showing once again what this Dirty South hip-hop country rock thing is all about, and doing it all with engaging energy and intensity.The Group has Disbandedand hasn'treleasedanynewmusicin a numberofyear."

In 2013, Thrasher wrote and recorded a song with Joe Diffie, "Girl Ridin' Shotgun". In response to Jason Aldeans song "1994"

Discography

Albums

References

External links

Country music groups from Georgia (U.S. state)
American hip hop groups
Country rap musicians
Musical groups established in 2003
Musical groups from Athens, Georgia